Methyl pivalate is an organic compound with the formula CH3O2CC(CH3)3. It is a colorless liquid, the methyl ester of pivalic acid. The ester is well known for being resistant to hydrolysis to the parent acid.  Hydrolysis can be effected with a solution of trimethylsilyl iodide in hot acetonitrile followed by aqueous workup.

References

Flavors
Methyl esters
Perfume ingredients
Pivalate esters